The concejo abierto (literally: "open council") is a system of government and administration of some very small Spanish municipalities and sub-municipal territorial units. An example of direct democracy, the system allows for the existence of a Mayor and a consejo or asamblea vecinal formed by all the electors of the municipality. In contrast, the conventional system used by most municipalities is the ayuntamiento, often translated as city, town or municipal council in English, comprised (in its most basic form) of the local councillors who form the plenary (elected in a party-list proportional representation voting), and the Mayor, elected in turn by the councillors among themselves.

History 
The origins of the system trace back to the Middle Ages, as a custom primarily originated in the Kingdoms of León and Castile, although it also extended to other territories as well, chiefly in the north of the Iberian Peninsula. In many settlements, the concejo abierto was replaced by the "regimiento" system (also called consejo cerrado, "close council"), in which a decision-making body of limited size formed by judges or alcaldes as well as a number of  regidores appointed by the King was contemplated; in the case of Castile, this process chiefly took place between 1345 and the later years of the rule of Alfonso XI.

The contemporary form of the concejo abierto is recognised in the 1978 Spanish Constitution.

See also 
 Local government in Spain
 Town meeting

References

Bibliography 
 
 
 

Local government in Spain
Direct democracy
Forms of local government